Gary Gannon (born 18 February 1987) is an Irish Social Democrats politician who has been a Teachta Dála (TD) for the Dublin Central constituency since the 2020 general election.

He served as a Dublin City Councillor from 2014 to 2020.

Background
Gannon was born in Dublin's North Inner City and now lives in Glasnevin. The son of a street trader, he left school to train as a plumber. He later studied History and Politics at Trinity College Dublin.

Political career
Gannon was elected to Dublin City Council in 2014 for the North Inner City local electoral area as an Independent candidate.

In September 2015, he joined the newly formed Social Democrats. Gannon was one of five general election candidates put forward by the Social Democrats to contest the 2016 general election. He ran in the Dublin Central constituency, losing out narrowly on a seat to Maureen O’Sullivan.

In May 2019, Gannon contested the 2019 European Parliament elections in the Dublin constituency. He was not elected. On the same day he was elected to Dublin City Council for the Cabra-Glasnevin local electoral area.

Gannon again stood as the Social Democrats candidate in the Dublin Central constituency at the 2020 general election and won a seat on the 9th count. Cat O'Driscoll was co-opted to Gannon's seat on Dublin City Council following his election to the Dáil.

As a TD Gannon has spoken on issues relating to access to education, and on how the lack of access to education can play into poverty and gang violence. He has also spoken about the Magdalene laundries and the need to preserve the historical significance of the sites.

In May 2021 Gannon called upon Foreign Affairs Minister Simon Coveney to expel the Israeli Ambassador to Ireland following the outbreak of the 2021 Israel–Palestine crisis.

In August 2021, following the Katherine Zappone controversy, Gannon wrote to the chair of the Oireachtas Foreign Affairs Committee Charlie Flanagan to demand that the committee investigate Zappone's appointment as a special envoy to the UN.

In November 2021 Gannon introduced a Bill to the Dáil which sought to “ensure that every single student and school that receives State funding will receive the same fact-based health, relationship and sex education regardless of their school’s ethos”, rather than sex education being dictated by religious values. Minister for Education Norma Foley did not oppose the Bill but called for a nine-month delay on its introduction in order to give time to schools to update their curriculums.

Political positions
Gannon has called for the Leaving Certificate to be radically reformed, decrying the current system as a “glorified memory test”, which “can be easily manipulated depending on your income”, while supporting a version that incorporates continuous assessment. Gannon supports the scrapping of Student Contributions to Universities in favour of a system of covering third level education costs through taxation.

Gannon supports harsher sentencing for those found guilty of committing assault with a deadly weapon.

Gannon supports harsher sanctions by the European Union on Belarus in order to pressure Alexander Lukashenko, whom Gannon labelled a "tyrant". Gannon has spoken in support of political prisoners jailed under Lukashenko.

References

External links
Social Democrats profile

Living people
1987 births
Alumni of Trinity College Dublin
Members of the 33rd Dáil
Politicians from Dublin (city)
Social Democrats (Ireland) TDs
Local councillors in Dublin (city)